The Bishop of Truro is the ordinary (diocesan bishop) of the Church of England Diocese of Truro in the Province of Canterbury.

History
There had been between the 9th and 11th centuries a Bishopric of Cornwall until it was merged with Crediton and the sees were transferred to Exeter in 1050.

The Diocese of Truro was established by Act of Parliament in 1876 under Queen Victoria. It was created by the division of the Diocese of Exeter in 1876 approximately along the Devon-Cornwall border (a few parishes of Devon west of the River Tamar were included in the new diocese). The bishop's seat is located at Truro Cathedral and his official residence at Lis Escop, Feock, south of Truro. The Bishop of Truro is assisted by the suffragan Bishop of St Germans in overseeing the diocese.

Until they moved to Feock the bishops resided at Kenwyn. Lis Escop (the Kenwyn Vicarage of 1780) became after the establishment of the Diocese of Truro the bishop's palace. After the bishops moved out for some years it housed part of Truro Cathedral School (closed 1981) then the Community of the Epiphany (Anglican nuns) and is now, as Epiphany House, a Christian retreat and conference centre. Lis Escop is Cornish for "bishop's palace".

List of bishops

Assistant bishops
Among those who have served as assistant bishops in the diocese were:
1930–1935: Rupert Mounsey CR, previously assisted the Bishop of Truro less formally, since 1925; former Bishop of Labuan and Sarawak (1909–1916)
19381949 (d.): John Holden, Vicar of St Budock (until 1944), Canon Residentiary of Truro Cathedral (1944–1947), Archdeacon of Cornwall (from 1947) and former Bishop of Kwangsi-Hunan, of Szechwan, and of Western Szechwan
19511960 (ret.): John Wellington, Vicar of St Germans, Archdeacon of Bodmin (1953–1956) and former Bishop of Shantung
19621973 (ret.): Bill Lash, Vicar of St  Clement (from 1963) and former Bishop in Bombay

Honorary assistant bishops — retired bishops taking on occasional duties voluntarily — have included:
19491954 (d.): John Willis, former Bishop of Uganda and Assistant Bishop of Leicester

References

Bibliography

External links

 Diocese of Truro
 Truro Cathedral

Truro
Bishops of Truro
Truro
Bishops of Truro
Christianity in Cornwall